is a passenger railway station located in the city of Kakogawa, Hyōgo Prefecture, Japan, operated by West Japan Railway Company (JR West).

Lines

The Miki Railway, which sopped operations in April 2008, had used Yakujin Station via the Miki Line.

Station layout
The station consists of two ground-level opposed side platforms, connected by an elevated station building. The station is unattended.

Platforms

Adjacent stations

|-
!colspan=5|Miki Railway (Abandoned)

History
It was renamed on 22 November 1916.

Passenger statistics
In fiscal 2019, the station was used by an average of 537 passengers daily

Surrounding area
 Sosa Yakujin Hachiman Shrine
 Miyayama Ruins
 Kakogawa City Yawata Elementary Schooll

See also
List of railway stations in Japan

References

External links

  

Railway stations in Hyōgo Prefecture
Railway stations in Japan opened in 1913
Kakogawa, Hyōgo